Krishnacore is a subgenre of hardcore punk that draws inspiration from the Hare Krishna tradition. Although some hardcore punk bands had already made references to Krishna Consciousness in the 1980s, the subgenre was established in the early 1990s by the bands Shelter and 108. The name is a portmanteau of "Krishna" and "hardcore".

Academic Colin Helb has described krishnacore as "a subculture of a subculture of a subculture." The subgenre has been met with surprise by some observers, due to the reputed contradictions between punk rock and Krishna Consciousness.

Precedents (1980s) 

Punk rock and Hinduism have converged occasionally since the early days of the genre. Singer Poly Styrene of the English band X-Ray Spex joined ISKCON following the breakup of her band in 1980. In the New York hardcore punk scene, the main influence on some musicians to embrace ISKCON was the Washington D.C.'s hardcore band Bad Brains which, despite being Rastas, "grafted fervent spirituality onto an otherwise nihilistic and antitranscendental genre." One of the first members of its scene to adopt Krishna consciousness was John Joseph of the Cro-Mags. New York bands Antidote and Cause for Alarm were among the first that began to explore Krishna consciousness in both their creative and personal lives, but the most prominent example was the Cro-Mags' debut album The Age of Quarrel (1986), whose title is a translation for the Hindu concept of Kali Yuga that is taught in Hare Krishna philosophy.

Music journalist Eric Caruncho has noted that the Filipino band The Wuds performed Krishna-influenced punk as early as 1986.

Establishment 

The band Shelter was formed in 1991, which is credited as the inventor of krishnacore.  Shelter consisted of two ex-members of Youth of Today, vocalist Ray Cappo and guitarist John Porcelly, who had become Krishna devotees.

The genre is also strongly associated with Equal Vision Records, which was formed by Shelter members to promote the Krishna movement. Other early acts within the genre include 108, Refuse to Fall and Prema.

Characteristics 
Although the Hare Krishna movement and many straight edgers shared the principles of refraining from drug use, vegetarianism and condemnation of illicit sex, the former also provided a transcendental and philosophical framework wherein lay these commitments. Academic Mike Dines states that krishnacore bands were "conscious of its own history and aesthetic." He highlights "the importance of the devotional doctrine of bhakti-yoga within this relationship; a doctrine that was to inform further the move from straightedge punk to Hare Krishna monk."

Dines therefore brings together rasa and the idea of Nada-Brahma to highlight the "unique fusion of Western popular music and the Eastern-based Indian spirituality (and lifestyle) of the Vaishnavas." In turning the punk aesthetic towards the devotional and, in particular, the transcendental vibration of the holy name, Krishnacore became a site of expression for bhakti-yoga. Moreover, Dines states "what provides validity to the connecting of Krishnacore and Indian aesthetics lies in the placement of those band members and associates who were involved in the scene." He concludes, "Ray Cappo, Robert Fish and Vic Dicara were not mere spectators of the Hare Krishna movement, but were indeed devotees themselves, reading and studying scripture, attending lectures and practicing the lifestyle of the devotee."

The difference between krishnacore and bands such as Cro-Mags or Cause for Alarm, which previously made some connections between the Hare Krishna movement and the hardcore scene, was that the service to Krishna had become the sole objective of krishnacore.

See also
Hindu music
Hardline (subculture)

Notes

References

Bibliography 

Punk rock genres
Hardcore punk genres
International Society for Krishna Consciousness
Straight edge